Basilica Cathedral of Arequipa is in Arepuipa, Peru.

Basilica Cathedral may also refer to:
Vannes Cathedral, also known as Basilica Cathedral St. Peter and St. Patern, Vannes
Basilica of Our Lady of the Pillar, also known as Our Lady of the Pilar Basilica-Cathedral

See also
 Cathedral of the Immaculate Conception (disambiguation)
Cathedral Basilica (disambiguation)
Basilica